Anthony Hill (born 1942) is an Australian author based in Canberra.

Born in Melbourne, Victoria, he attended the University of Melbourne from 1960 until 1963 and then worked as a journalist at the Melbourne Herald before joining the Parliamentary Press Gallery in 1972.  In 1977 he left the Press Gallery to run an antique shop near Yass, which he did for the next six years. From 1989 until 1999 he was a speech writer for the Australian governors-general William Hayden and Sir William Deane.  He has written twelve books, with Young Digger and Soldier Boy winning prizes.

Bibliography (partial)
 Birdsong, 1988
 The Burnt Stick, 1994
 Spindrift, 1996
 Soldier Boy, 2001
 Forbidden, 2002
 Young Digger, Penguin Books, Melbourne, 2002, 
 Animal Heroes, Penguin Books, Melbourne, 2005, 234 pages, 
 Lucy's Cat and the Rainbow Birds, Jane Tanner (illus), Camberwell, 2007, 32 pages,  The story of a girl Lucy, who feeds various Australian native birds (including galahs, cockatoos, rosellas, spinebills, lorikeets and parrots) in a tree in her garden and her tabby cat called Artemis who likes to chase them.  Lucy first puts one bell on Artemis to warn the birds to no avail then another until he has four bells around his neck so he cannot sneak up on the birds without warning them with the bells' ringing.  The story ends with Lucy sitting reading a book, Artemis lying beside her and the birds flying around.
 Captain Cook's Apprentice, 2009

References

External links

 Young Digger Worksheet for teachers and students
 The Papers of Anthony Hill
 Anthony Hill's Website

1942 births
Living people
Australian non-fiction writers
Australian children's writers
Writers from Canberra
Writers from Melbourne